Norman Tozer (13 July 1934 – 14 July 2010) was a freelance reporter who appeared on Tom Tom, a children's programme produced by the BBC in Bristol.  Among his other roles, he reported for BBC London News and such BBC Radio 4 programmes as Woman's Hour and You and Yours. He died of cancer at the age of 76.

References 

1934 births
2010 deaths
British television presenters
Deaths from cancer in the United Kingdom